The Manhyia Palace Museum is a historical museum located in Kumasi, Ashanti, Ghana and situated within the Manhyia Palace. First established in 1925 as a private residence for Asantehene Agyeman Prempeh I (who had been returning from almost three decades of exile), the Museum currently provides fair insight into the culture of Ashantiland and Ghana's cultural legacy from before its colonization by Great Britain. It primarily serves "to commemorate (the Ashanti people's) own kings, queens and leaders and to communicate the riches of their history and culture to future generations". and generally features video presentations and key historical items pertaining to Ashantiland and Ghana's ancestry. It was rehabilitated in 1995 at about 12,000 cedis and subsequently reopened to the public on August 12 of that year by Otumfuo Opoku Ware II, the 15th King as part of his Silver Jubilee celebration.

See also 
 List of museums in Ghana

References

External links 
 Homepage

Museums in Ghana
Buildings and structures in Kumasi